Roberts Chapel is a historic chapel in Nicholasville, Kentucky.

It was built in 1845 and added to the National Register of Historic Places in 1984.  During the Civil War, the hospital's proximity to Camp Nelson prompted its use as a military hospital.

References

United Methodist churches in Kentucky
Churches on the National Register of Historic Places in Kentucky
Gothic Revival church buildings in Kentucky
Churches completed in 1845
19th-century Methodist church buildings in the United States
Churches in Jessamine County, Kentucky
National Register of Historic Places in Jessamine County, Kentucky
American Civil War hospitals
Defunct hospitals in Kentucky
1845 establishments in Kentucky
Nicholasville, Kentucky